The 2014 Powiat Poznański Open was a professional tennis tournament played on outdoor clay courts. It was the first edition of the tournament which was part of the 2014 ITF Women's Circuit, offering a total of $50,000 in prize money. It took place in Sobota, Greater Poland Voivodeship, Poland, on 21–27 July 2014.

Singles main draw entrants

Seeds 

 1 Rankings as of 14 July 2014

Other entrants 
The following players received wildcards into the singles main draw:
  Magdalena Fręch
  Katarzyna Kawa
  Daria Kuczer
  Natalie Suk

The following players received entry from the qualifying draw:
  Natela Dzalamidze
  Anastasia Grymalska
  Pernilla Mendesová
  Valeria Savinykh

The following players received entry into the singles main draw as lucky losers:
  Inés Ferrer Suárez
  Lina Stančiūtė

The following players received entry by a Special Exempt:
  Barbora Krejčíková
  Lara Michel

Champions

Singles 

  Kristína Kučová def.  Sesil Karatantcheva 1–6, 7–5, 6–3

Doubles 

  Barbora Krejčíková /  Aleksandra Krunić def.  Anastasiya Vasylyeva /  Maryna Zanevska 3–6, 6–0, [10–6]

External links 
 2014 Powiat Poznański Open at ITFtennis.com
 Official website 

Sobota
Clay court tennis tournaments
Tennis tournaments in Poland
2014 in Polish tennis
WSG Open